In commutative algebra, a Zariski ring is a commutative Noetherian topological ring A whose topology is defined by an ideal  contained in the Jacobson radical, the intersection of all maximal ideals. Examples of Zariski rings are noetherian local rings with the topology induced by the maximal ideal, and -adic completions of Noetherian rings.

Let A be a Noetherian topological ring with the topology defined by an ideal . Then the following are equivalent.
 A is a Zariski ring.
 The completion  is faithfully flat over A (in general, it is only flat over A).
 Every maximal ideal is closed.

References

Commutative algebra